For a record label, see Kitchenware Records

Kitchenware are the tools, utensils, appliances, dishes, and cookware used in food preparation,  or the serving of food. Kitchenware can also be used in order to hold or store food before or after preparation.

Types

Kitchenware encompasses a wide range of tools. Some of the most common items of kitchenware are:

See also

 Batterie de cuisine
 Cookware and bakeware
 Gastronorm, a European size standard for kitchenware 
 List of cooking vessels
 List of eating utensils
 List of food preparation utensils
 List of glassware
 List of Japanese cooking utensils
 List of serving utensils
 List of types of spoons
 NSF International, formerly "National Sanitation Foundation"
 Tableware

References

External links
 
 

 
Home